Jiao Lansheng (born May 1962) is a former Chinese politician who spent his entire career in south China's Guangdong province. As of November 2022 he was under investigation by China's top anti-corruption agency. Previously he served as party secretary of Yangjiang and mayor of Zhongshan.

He is a delegate to the 13th National People's Congress.

Early life and education
Jiao was born in Lanzhou, Gansu, in May 1962, while his ancestral home in Changyuan, Henan. After resuming the college entrance examination, in 1978, he was accepted to Xi'an Institute of Metallurgical Architecture (now Xi'an University of Architecture and Technology), where he majored in industrial and civil buildings.

Political career
After university in 1982, Jiao worked at China Nonferrous Metals Third Construction Company and than the Zhuhai Real Estate Development Management Office.

Jiao joined the Chinese Communist Party (CCP) in February 1985. He got involved in politics in October 1993, when he was appointed deputy director of the Zhuhai Municipal Infrastructure Land Development Management Center. He assumed various administrative and political roles in Zhuhai, including director of Zhuhai Environmental Protection Bureau (2001–2004), director of Zhuhai Lingang Industrial Zone Management Committee (2004–2006), director of Zhuhai Gaolangang Economic Zone Management Committee (2006–2008), party secretary of Doumen District (2008–2012), chairman of the People's Congress of Doumen District (2008–2012), and secretary of the Political and Legal Affairs Commission of the CCP Zhuhai Municipal Committee (2011–2014). He also served as vice mayor of Yangjiang from December 2013 to April 2016.

In April 2016, he was named acting mayor of Zhongshan, confirmed in the following month.

In October 2018, he was recalled to Yangjiang. He was appointed party secretary, concurrently serving as chairman of its People's Congress.

Investigation
On 7 November 2022, he has been placed under investigation for "serious violations of laws and regulations" by the Central Commission for Discipline Inspection (CCDI), the party's internal disciplinary body, and the National Supervisory Commission, the highest anti-corruption agency of China.

References

1962 births
Living people
People from Lanzhou
Xi'an University of Architecture and Technology alumni
Sun Yat-sen University alumni
People's Republic of China politicians from Gansu
Chinese Communist Party politicians from Gansu
Delegates to the 13th National People's Congress